The Lotus C-01 is a concept motorcycle revealed in 2014. It was manufactured by Kodewa under brand license from Group Lotus. It was designed by Daniel Simon, using a carbon fiber monocoque body shell described as "menacingly retro-futuristic", and "la science-fiction rejoint la réalité" or "science fiction joined with reality". A commentator called it "sort of a power cruiser" comparing it to the European exotic Ducati Diavel power cruiser.

The engine is a 200 hp tuned version of the 75 degree v-twin Rotax motor used in the KTM RC8R superbike.

Specifications
Specifications in the adjacent box are from Gizmag.

References

Notes

Sources

External links

Motorcycles introduced in 2014
Motorcycles of the United Kingdom
Motorcycles of Germany
Concept motorcycles